Dr. Craig Partridge is an American computer scientist, best known for his contributions to the technical development of the Internet.

Partridge graduated in 1979 from Woodrow Wilson High School in Washington D.C. He received his A.B. in history in 1983, and in 1992 received his Ph.D. in computer science, from Harvard University.

Starting in 1983, Partridge was a researcher at BBN Technologies, where he eventually became Chief Scientist for networking research. During the 1980s, Dr. Partridge designed the method of email routing using domain names, and, in collaboration with Phil Karn, made contributions to the Transmission Control Protocol (TCP) round-trip time estimation by inventing Karn's algorithm. In the 1990s he co-invented anycast addressing, led the team that developed the first multi-gigabit router. 

Partridge served on the first Internet Engineering Steering Group, has chaired the Association for Computing Machinery's Special Interest Group on Data Communications (SIGCOMM), been editor-in-chief of both the Institute of Electrical and Electronics Engineers (IEEE) Network Magazine and SIGCOMM's Computer Communication Review, and served on the National Science Foundation's Computer, Information Science and Engineering (CISE) Advisory Committee, and on the National Research Council's Computer Science and Telecommunications Board. He has held adjunct faculty positions at Stanford University and the University of Michigan, and currently chairs the Department of Computer Science in Colorado State University.

Partridge is an ACM Fellow and IEEE Fellow, and in 2017 was inducted into the Internet Hall of Fame.

Selected works 
 "Mail routing and the domain system", RFC 974, Craig Partridge, 1986.
 "Improving round-trip time estimates in reliable transport protocols", Phil Karn, Craig Partridge ACM SIGCOMM Computer Communication Review, 1987.
 "Host Anycasting Service", RFC 1546, Craig Partridge, Trevor Mendez, Walter Milliken, 1993.
 Gigabit Networking, Craig Partridge, Addison-Wesley, 1993.

References 

Living people
American computer scientists
Fellows of the Association for Computing Machinery
Fellow Members of the IEEE
Harvard College alumni
Colorado State University faculty
1961 births